Sex differences in human physiology are distinctions of physiological characteristics associated with either male or female humans. These differences are caused by the effects of the different sex chromosome complement in males and females, and differential exposure to gonadal sex hormones during development. Sexual dimorphism is a term for the phenotypic difference between males and females of the same species.

The process of meiosis and fertilization (with rare exceptions) results in a zygote with either two X chromosomes (an XX female) or one X and one Y chromosome (an XY male) which then develops the typical female or male phenotype. Physiological sex differences include discrete features such as the respective male and female reproductive systems, as well as average differences between males and females including size and strength, bodily proportions, hair distribution, breast differentiation, voice pitch, and brain size and structure.

Sex determination and differentiation 

 
The human genome consists of two copies of each of 23 chromosomes (a total of 46). One set of 23 comes from the mother and one set comes from the father. Of these 23 pairs of chromosomes, 22 are autosomes, and one is a sex chromosome. There are two kinds of sex chromosomes–X and Y. In humans and in almost all other mammals, females carry two X chromosomes, designated XX, and males carry one X and one Y, designated XY.

A human egg contains only one set of chromosomes (23) and is a haploid. Sperm also have only one set of 23 chromosomes and are therefore haploid. When an egg and sperm fuse at fertilization, the two sets of chromosomes come together to form a unique diploid individual with 46 chromosomes.

The sex chromosome in a human egg is always an X chromosome since a female only has X sex chromosomes. In sperm, about half the sperm have an X chromosome and half have a Y chromosome. If an egg fuses with sperm with a Y chromosome, the resulting individual is male. If an egg fuses with sperm with an X chromosome, the resulting individual is female. There are rare exceptions to this rule in which, for example, XX individuals develop as males or XY individuals develop as females. Chromosomes are not the final determinant of sex. In some cases, for example, chromosomally female babies that have been exposed to high levels of androgens before birth can develop masculinized genitals by the time they are born. There are other variations of sex chromosomes that lead to a variety of different physical expressions.

The X-chromosome carries a larger number of genes in comparison to the Y-chromosome. In humans, X-chromosome inactivation enables males and females to have an equal expression of the genes on the X-chromosome since females have two X-chromosomes while males have a single X and a Y chromosome. X-chromosome inactivation is random in the somatic cells of the body as either the maternal or paternal X-chromosome can become inactivated in each cell. Thus, females are genetic mosaics.

Size and body shape 

 Externally, the most sexually dimorphic portions of the human body are the chest, the lower half of the face, and the area between the waist and the knees.
 Men weigh more than women. 
 On average, men are taller than women by about 10%. 
 On average, men have a larger waist in comparison to their hips (see waist–hip ratio) than women.
In women, the index and ring fingers tend to be either more similar in size or their index finger is slightly longer than their ring finger, whereas men's ring finger tends to be longer.

Skeleton and muscular system

Skeleton 

The female skeleton is generally less massive, smoother, and more delicate than the male; its rib cage is more rounded and smaller, its lumbar curve greater, and a generally longer and smaller female waist results from the chest being more narrow at the base, and the pelvis generally not as high.

The pelvis is, in general, different between the human female and male skeleton. Although variations exist and there may be a degree of overlap between typically male or female traits, the pelvis is the most dimorphic bone of the human skeleton and is therefore likely to be accurate when using it to ascertain a person's sex. It differs both in overall shape and structure. The female pelvis, which is adapted for gestation and childbirth, is less high, but proportionately wider and more circular than in the male; its sacrum—the triangular bone at the upper posterior of the pelvic cavity, serving as the base of the spine—is also wider. The female pelvis is tilted anteriorly, often resulting in the more sway-backed appearance.

In females, the acetabula, the concave surfaces to which the balls of the femurs attach via ligaments, are located farther apart, which increases the distance between the most outer points of the femurs (their greater trochanters) and thus the width of the hips. Female femurs are therefore more generally angled (laterally, further away from vertical). This greater angle applies a larger portion of the gravitational or vertical load as valgus torque (rotational force against the knee). This, combined with the female's weaker tendons and ligaments and a narrower intercondylar notch, causes increased susceptibility to injury of the ACL in female athletes.

The pelvis of the human male is slightly narrower. One hypothesis is that this makes it more optimized for walking and that the wider female pelvis is an evolutionary compromise between efficient walking and the need for successful childbirth. This is termed the obstetrical dilemma. Disagreement exists as to the strength of the hypothesis.

Males and females do not differ in their number of ribs; both normally have twelve pairs.

The following further generalizations have been made regarding male-female skeletal differences:

 Males in general have denser, stronger bones, tendons, and ligaments.
 Female skulls and head bones differ in size and shape from the male skull, with the male mandible generally wider, larger, and squarer than the female. In addition, males generally have a more prominent brow, an orbital with rounded border, and more greatly projecting mastoid processes.
 Males have a more pronounced Adam's apple or thyroid cartilage and deeper voices due to larger vocal cords.
 Males have larger teeth than females and a greater proportion of the tooth in males is made up of dentine, whereas females have proportionately more enamel.

Muscle mass and strength 
Pubertal changes in males lead to a ten times increase in testosterone. Because of this and because males go through puberty for longer, females typically have lower total muscle mass than males, and also have lower muscle mass in comparison to total body mass. Males convert more of their caloric intake into muscle and expendable circulating energy reserves, while females tend to convert more into fat deposits. As a consequence, men are generally physically stronger than women. Research suggests that, while men have greater total muscle areas than women, the number of muscle fibers in men and women are alike. Instead of muscle fiber composition as the main reason for men's greater absolute strength, the data indicates that it is total muscle area that is responsible for this difference. Men's individual muscle fibers are larger than women's, which results in their more muscular appearance. Their larger muscle fibers appear responsible for their more considerable absolute force production.

The sex difference in muscle mass remains after adjusting for body weight and height. Men are at least one-third stronger than women when adjusting for differences in total body mass, due to the higher male muscle-mass to body-mass ratio. The greater muscle mass is reported to be due to a greater capacity for muscular hypertrophy as a result of higher levels of circulating testosterone in males.

Gross measures of body strength suggest that women are approximately 50-60% as strong as men in the upper body, and 60-70% as strong in the lower body. One study of muscle strength in the elbows and knees—in 45 and older males and females—found the strength of females to range from 42 to 63% of male strength. Men have greater hand grip strength than women. Differences in width of arm, thighs and calves appear during puberty.

Respiratory system 
Males typically have larger tracheae and main bronchi and greater lung volume per body mass. They also have larger hearts, 10% higher red blood cell count, and higher haemoglobin hence greater oxygen-carrying capacity. They have higher circulating clotting factors (vitamin K, prothrombin and platelets). These differences lead to faster clotting of blood and higher peripheral pain tolerance.

Sex differences in the trachea and main bronchi are not apparent until at least age 14. On average, girls have smaller lungs than boys at birth.

Skin and hair

Skin 
Men's skin is thicker and oilier than women's skin. Women have more subcutaneous fat than men. This helps keep them warmer and enables them to survive lower temperatures than men during the cold. As a result of greater vasoconstriction, while the surface of female skin is colder than male skin, the deep-skin temperature in women is higher than in men.

Males generally have darker skin than females. The lighter skin in females helps their bodies synthesize more Vitamin D from sunlight and absorb more calcium, which is needed during pregnancy and lactation.

Hair 
On average, men have more body hair than women. Men have relatively more of a type of hair called terminal hair, especially on the face, chest, abdomen and back. Women have more vellus hair, which is thinner, shorter, and lighter, and therefore less visible.

Although men grow hair faster than women, baldness is more prevalent in men than in women. The main cause for this is male pattern baldness. Male pattern baldness is a condition where hair loss occurs in a typical pattern of a receding hairline and hair thinning on the crown. It is caused by hormones and genetic predisposition.

Color 

In lighter-complected humans, male skin is visibly redder; this is due to greater blood volume rather than melanin. Conversely, women are lighter-skinned than men in some studied human populations. The differences in color are mainly caused by higher levels of melanin in the skin, hair and eyes in males.

In one study, almost twice as many females as males had red or auburn hair. A higher proportion of females were also found to have blond hair, whereas males were more likely to have black or dark brown hair. Another study found green eyes, which are a result of lower melanin levels, to be much more common in women than in men, at least by a factor of two.

A different study found that while women tend to have a lower frequency of black hair, men have a higher frequency of platinum blond hair, blue eyes and lighter skin. According to this one theory the cause for this is a higher frequency of genetic recombination in women than in men, possibly due to sex-linked genes, and as a result women tend to show less phenotypical variation in any given population.

The human sexual dimorphism in color seems to be greater in populations that are medium in skin color than in very light or very dark-colored populations.

Sexual organs and reproductive systems 

Males and females have different sex organs. Females have two ovaries that store the eggs, and a uterus which is connected to a vagina. Males have testicles that produce sperm. The testicles are placed in the scrotum behind the penis. The male penis and scrotum are external extremities, whereas the female sex organs are placed "inside" the body.
 Male orgasm (and the corresponding release of ejaculate containing sperm from the testes) is essential for reproduction, whereas female orgasm is not. The female orgasm was originally believed to have no function other than pleasure. Later evidence suggests that it evolved as a discriminatory advantage in regards to mate selection.

Female ejaculation has been observed for 2,000 years. It refers to the release of fluid experienced by some females during orgasm. The components of the ejaculate are comparable to that of the male ejaculate. The release of this fluid is a product of the Skene's gland (female prostate), located within the walls of the urethra. The female prostate is much smaller than the male prostate but seems to behave in a similar fashion. Female ejaculate, though, does not contain sperm. The female prostate is visible through MRI and ultrasound.

Reproductive capacity and cost 
Males typically produce billions of sperm each month, many of which are capable of fertilization. Females typically produce one ovum a month that can be fertilized into an embryo. Thus during a lifetime males are able to father a significantly greater number of children than females can give birth to. The most fertile female, according to the Guinness Book of World Records, was the wife of Feodor Vassilyev of Russia (1707–1782) who had 69 surviving children. The most prolific father of all time is believed to be the last Sharifian Emperor of Morocco, Mulai Ismail (1646–1727) who reportedly fathered more than 800 children from a harem of 500 women.

Fertility 
Female fertility declines after age 30 and ends with the menopause. Female physical experiences vary depending on external forces such as diet, marriage patterns, culture, and other aspects. In Western nations menstruation begins to affect females at 13 and menopause starts around 51. In non-industrialized countries, on the other hand, most females begin menstruation at a later age. More lactation in the lifetime of non-western females inhibits ovulation and extends the number of fertile years. Pregnancy in the 40s or later has been correlated with increased risk of Down syndrome in children. Males are capable of fathering children into old age. Paternal age effects in children include multiple sclerosis, autism, breast cancer and schizophrenia, as well as reduced intelligence.

Adriana Iliescu was reported as the world's oldest woman to give birth, at age 66. Her record stood until Maria del Carmen Bousada de Lara gave birth to twin sons at Sant Pau Hospital in Barcelona, Spain on December 29, 2006, at the age of 67. In both cases IVF was used. The oldest known father was former Australian miner Les Colley, who fathered a child at age 93.

Brain and nervous system

Brain 

The brains of humans, like many animals, are slightly different for males and females.

Brain size 
Early research into the differences between male and female brains showed that male brains are, on average, larger than female brains. This research was frequently cited to support the assertion that women are less intelligent than men. One of the most influential early researchers on this topic was Paul Broca. In 1861, he examined 432 human brains from cadavers and found that the brains of men had an average weight of 1325 grams, while the brains of women had an average weight of 1144 grams. This study, however, did not control for differences in body size or age. Later studies have shown that while men's brains are an average of 10-15% larger and heavier than women's brains, there is relatively no difference when controlling for body weight. This means the brain-to-body mass ratio is, on average, approximately the same for both sexes. Comparing a man and a woman of the same body size, an average difference of 100 grams in brain-mass is present, the man having the bigger and heavier brain. This difference of 100 grams applies over the whole range of human sizes.

Brain structure 

Structural brain differences usually correspond to sexually dimorphic attributes that bring about functional brain differences.

On average, female brains have a larger ratio of grey matter to the white matter than males (particularly in the dorsolateral prefrontal cortex and superior temporal gyrus), even when sex-differences in the total intracranial volume are taken into consideration. Most notably, males have a larger amount of white matter in the frontal and temporal perisylvian region, and in the temporal stem and optic radiation, of the left hemisphere, whereas females have a larger amount of gray matter in the superior temporal gyrus, planum temporale, Heschl gyrus, cingulate gyrus, inferior frontal, and central sulci margins, of the left hemisphere.

The degree of hemispheric asymmetry in males corresponds to the relative size of corpus callosum; however, this is not true in females. An increase in hemispheric asymmetry in male brains causes a male sex-dependent decrease in inter-hemispheric connectivity. Many studies suggest that, on average, female brains have more commissural tracts involved in inter-hemispheric connectivity than males. Specifically, studies suggests that:

 The anterior commissure is larger in females than males.
 The massa intermedia is more abundant in females than males.
 Females have a larger ratio of the cross-sectional area of the corpus callosum to cerebral volume and to forebrain size than males.

A few studies have reached contrary conclusions.

Typically, male brains are more asymmetric than female brains. Females have less asymmetry than males between left and right hemispheric cortical thickness. Males have a larger intra-hemispheric long-range interconnectivity than females, whereas females have larger inter-hemispheric connectivity. Males have larger left-hemispheric asymmetries than females in a number of brain areas, including the superior temporal gyrus, Heschl gyrus, deeper central sulcus, overall temporal and parietal, and inferior parietal lobule, thalamus and posterior cingulate. A few studies seemed to indicate otherwise.

There are also differences in the structure of specific areas of the brain. On average, the SDN has been repeatedly found to be considerably larger in males than in females. The volume of the SDN was 2.2 times as large in males as in females. On average, the BSTc is twice as large in men as in women. On average, the INAH-3 is significantly larger in males than in females regardless of age. Two studies found that men have larger parietal lobes, an area responsible for sensory input including spatial sense and navigation; though, another study failed to find any statistically significant difference. At the same time, females have larger Wernicke's and Broca's areas, areas responsible for language processing. Studies using MRI scanning have shown that the auditory and language-related regions in the left hemisphere are proportionally expanded in females versus in males. Conversely, the primary visual, and visuo-spatial association areas of the parietal lobes are proportionally larger in males. The corpus callous is located at the sagittal divide and is the primary commissure in the human brain. It connects the left and right hemispheres of the cerebral cortex, which allows them to communicate with each other. With respect to language, males predominantly use their left hemisphere but females use both their right and left hemispheres. The right hemisphere controls emotion, so using the right hemisphere adds more prosody to speech. In males, the corpus callosum is larger than females. However, the splenium and the isthmus subregions of the corpus callosum are larger in females. The genu subregion is larger in males. These subregions may serve as the basis for sex differences in language. However, a 1997 meta-study concluded that there is no relative size difference, and that the larger corpus callosum in males is due to generally larger brains in males on average.
In total and on average, females have a higher percentage of grey matter in comparison to males, and males a higher percentage of white matter. However, some researchers maintain that as males have larger brains on average than females, when adjusted for total brain volume, the grey matter differences between sexes is small or nonexistent. Thus, the percentage of grey matter appears to be more related to brain size than it is to gender.

In 2005, Haier et al. reported that, compared with men, women show fewer grey matter areas associated with intelligence, but more white matter areas associated with intelligence. He concluded that "men and women apparently achieve similar IQ results with different brain regions, suggesting that there is no singular underlying neuroanatomical structure to general intelligence and that different types of brain designs may manifest equivalent intellectual performance." Using brain mapping, it was shown that men have more than six times the amount of gray matter related to general intelligence than women, and women have nearly ten times the amount of white matter related to intelligence than men. They also report that the brain areas correlated with IQ differ between the sexes. In short, men and women apparently achieve similar IQ results with different brain regions. Other differences that have been established include greater length in males of myelinated axons in their white matter (176,000 km compared to 146,000 km); and 33% more synapses per mm3 of cerebral cortex. Another difference is that females generally have faster blood flow to their brains and lose less brain tissue as they age than males do. Additionally, depression and chronic anxiety are much more common in women than in men, and it has been speculated by some that this is due to differences in the brain's serotonin system. Others contend this speculation ignores the social and material differences between men and women that are known to impact anxiety and depression.

The amygdala, which is the structure that responds to emotionally arousing information, respond to the environment, and reacts with stress. The male amygdala is proportionally larger than that in women, causing sex to be a determining factor in reactions to stress. In studies of rats, there are more numerous interconnections seen in males in regard to this structure, suggesting the same pattern in humans. Katharina Braun and company (Otto von Guericke University, Magdeburg, Germany) studied a litter of Degu puppies removed from their mother and determined that hearing their mother's call produced a higher concentration of serotonin in males' amygdala and a decreased concentration in females' amygdala. In this case, stress causes females' emotion regulation to drop, while males seem to keep more of an even keel. While this study was limited to rodents, it provides a possible explanation of why anxiety disorders occur more often among human females than males. Also, the hypothalamus and front medial area, both of which are associated with emotional processing, are larger in males than females. Other brain areas related to emotion, such as the orbitofrontal cortex, medial paralimbic region, and hippocampus are larger in females than males.

The hippocampus has been proven by imaging to be larger in women than men. The hippocampus is crucial for memory storage and spatial mapping of the physical environment. This structural difference may be responsible for variations in behavior between the sexes. Studies show that women are more likely to navigate using landmarks, while men are more likely to estimate distance in space or orientation. Studies of rats show that males could learn better in the face of acute stress, while chronic stress is dealt with better by females. Sex hormones may influence female hippocampal cells to tolerate brain damage better than the same cells in men. The studies of the rats' influx and deflation of hippocampal cells can be translated to the difference in memory and spatial behaviors between the sexes.

On average, Onuf's nucleus is sexually dimorphic, meaning that there are differences in Onuf's nucleus between males and females of the same species. Males of these species have more of these motoneurons than do their female counterparts.

Brain connectivity 
Research done at the Medical School of University of Pennsylvania found substantial differences in brain connectivity between males and females in 2013. The study examined 949 individuals (521 females and 428 males) of ages between 8 and 22. Overall, male brains showed more connectivity from back to front and within hemispheres, while female brains showed more connectivity between the left and right hemispheres of the cerebrum. In contrast to connectivity to the cerebrum, in the cerebellum, the part of the brain that plays a major role in the motor tasks, females showed higher intra-hemispheric connectivity while males showed higher inter-hemispheric connectivity. The differences were more pronounced in people aged 14 or older.

The researchers stated that these findings potentially provide a neural basis for observable sex differences in psychology. The research was consistent with previous studies that found that females performed better than males on tasks of attention, face and word memory, and social cognition tests, while males performed better on spatial processing and sensorimotor skill tasks. On average, men outperformed women at learning and accomplishing single tasks, like cycling and navigating directions, while females had better memory and social cognition skills making them more adjusted to multitasking and coming up with consensus solutions. It has been suggested that the increased differentiation of brain connectivity in adolescence is in correlation with hormonal changes in puberty.

A 2014 study by the same research group using rsfc-MRI (resting-state functional connectivity MRI) found similar results to the previous one, with males on average outperforming females on motor and spatial cognitive tests, and females on average outperforming males on emotional recognition and nonverbal reasoning tasks.

Genetic and hormonal causes 
Both genes and hormones affect the formation of human brains before birth, as well as the behavior of adult individuals. Several genes that code for differences between male and female brains have been identified. In the human brain, a difference between sexes was observed in the transcription of the PCDH11X/Y gene pair, a pair unique to Homo sapiens. It has been argued that the Y chromosome is primarily responsible for males being more susceptible to mental illnesses. Several psychological studies contradict this however, as it has been found that female patients are actually more than twice as likely as male patients to be susceptible to depressive episodes and generalized anxiety, and additionally that progesterone levels in females actually stall the body's ability to turn off stressor hormones resulting in female subjects entering depressive episodes at even lower levels of stress than male subjects.

Hormones significantly affect human brain formation, as well as brain development at puberty. A 2004 review in Nature Reviews Neuroscience observed that "because it is easier to manipulate hormone levels than the expression of sex chromosome genes, the effects of hormones have been studied much more extensively, and are much better understood, than the direct actions in the brain of sex chromosome genes." It concluded that while "the differentiating effects of gonadal secretions seem to be
dominant," the existing body of research "supports the idea that sex differences in neural expression
of X and Y genes significantly contribute to sex differences in brain functions and disease."

Selective pressures of evolution can cause innate biological brain differences before a child is even born. Research done on vervet monkeys showed that male and female monkeys gravitated towards sex-typical preferred toys. This study controls for external societal influence by using monkeys as the subject and projects results to humans, the closest animal relative. A separate study was done on one-day-old infants to see if infants diverted attention differently between the sexes. Results showed that there must be some innate mechanism that differs between the sexes. This innate mechanism is evolutionary in the sense that the hormones for females are concurrently passed down to other females, and the same with males.

Other than external genitals, there are few physical differences before puberty. Small differences in height and start of physical maturity are seen. In the first decade of human life, there is a significant amount of overlap between children of both sexes. The gradual growth in sex difference throughout a person's life is a product of various hormones. Testosterone is the major active hormone in male development while estrogen is the dominant female hormone. These hormones are not, however, limited to each sex. Both males and females have both testosterone and estrogen.

Sensory systems 

 Some studies have shown that females have a more sensitive sense of smell than males, both in the differentiation of odors and in the detection of slight or faint odors.
 Females have more pain receptors in the skin. That may contribute to the lower pain tolerance of women. While most women expect to be less tolerant to pain, men expect to be more tolerant and therefore report agitation later. Due to variation across societies of gender roles, results of pain studies also vary depending on gender expectations.
 Females also report a higher prevalence of many pain-related diseases and syndromes, particularly auto-immune diseases. In a 2005 study, Holdcroft and Beckley show a higher female prevalence of many conditions of the head and neck (e.g., migraine), limbs (e.g., carpal tunnel syndrome), internal organs (IBS), and more general conditions (multiple sclerosis). Fewer conditions show a male prevalence: e.g., cluster headache, gout.
 In addition to defined diseases and syndromes, many common "everyday" pains appear to overburden women rather than men. Therefore, studies consistently find that women report more severe pain, more frequent pain, longer-lasting pain, and wider-ranging pain than men. For example, common painful conditions such as dysmenorrhea may predispose females to more widespread musculoskeletal pains.
Women show higher performance levels on tests of verbal fluency. This may be because the female auditory cortex is denser than that of the male. This difference and other sensory differences like it could be because of the sex hormones that impact the fetal brain during development.

Immune system 

Strength and type of immune response differ in men and women. Generally speaking, women have a stronger immune response than men. This results in men having a higher morbidity and mortality from infectious diseases than women do, and lower rates of auto-immune diseases.

Tissues and hormones 
 Women generally have a higher body fat percentage than men, whereas men generally have more muscle tissue mass.
 Women usually have lower blood pressure than men, and women's hearts beat faster, even when they are asleep.
 Men and women have different levels of certain hormones. Men have a higher concentration of androgens while women have a higher concentration of estrogens. 
To date, wound healing studies have chiefly reported a female advantage in healing of dermal wounds. On the other hand, studies have found a male advantage in healing rates of mucosal wounds. Thus, gender advantages in wound healing appear to be tissue specific. 
 Adult men have approximately 5.2 million red blood cells per cubic millimeter of blood, whereas women have approximately 4.6 million.
 Females typically have more white blood cells (stored and circulating), more granulocytes, and B and T lymphocytes. Additionally, they produce more antibodies at a faster rate than males. Hence they develop fewer infectious diseases and succumb for shorter periods.
 Recent findings revealed that there are several differences in cellular characteristics (e.g., cytoskeleton) of female and male cells.

Health

Life span 
Females live longer than males in most countries around the world. In Russia, however, the sex-associated gap has been increasing as male life expectancy declines.

The longer average life span of women can lead to skewed statistical results in regard to sex differences. For example, women are often seen to be at a higher risk of bone fracture due to osteoporosis. Although women do lose bone density faster than men after menopause, the data shows a larger disparity because there are more older women in the population.

Illness and injury

Sex chromosome disorders 
Certain diseases and conditions are clearly sex-related in that they are caused by the same chromosomes that regulate sex differentiation. Some conditions are X-linked recessive, in that the gene is carried on the X chromosome. Genetic females (XX) will show symptoms of the disease only if both their X chromosomes are defective with a similar deficiency, whereas genetic males (XY) will show symptoms of the disease if their only X chromosome is defective. (A woman may carry such a disease on one X chromosome but not show symptoms if the other X chromosome works sufficiently.) For this reason, such conditions are far more common in males than in females.

X-linked recessive disorders include:
Red-green colour blindness
Haemophilia A (factor VIII)
Haemophilia B (factor IX)
Duchenne Muscular Dystrophy
X-linked agammaglobulinaemia
X-linked ichythyosis
Becker muscular dystrophy
Non-specific X-linked mental retardation

X-linked dominant disorders include:
Xg blood group
Vitamin D resistant rickets
Rett's syndrome
Fragile X syndrome

There are diseases that are caused by a defective Y chromosome or a defective number of them.

Differences not linked to sex chromosomes 
The World Health Organization (WHO) has produced a number of reports on gender and health. The following trends are shown:
 Overall rates of mental illness are similar for men and women. There is no significant gender difference in rates of schizophrenia and bipolar depression. Women are more likely to suffer from unipolar depression, anxiety, eating disorders, and post-traumatic stress disorder. Men are more likely to suffer from alcoholism and antisocial personality disorder, as well as developmental psychiatric disorders such as autism spectrum disorders and Tourette syndrome.
 Women are more likely to suffer from depression, due in part to the low social status being such a powerful predictor for depression.
 While men are more likely to suffer from alcoholism, women are more prone to addiction. This is because estrogen boosts the release of dopamine in brain regions important for regulating drug-seeking behavior, making women more vulnerable to dependence.
 Schizophrenia does not show prevalence differences of significance among sexes, but there is a difference in the brain structures related. Women naturally have a higher orbitofrontal-to-amygdala ratio (OAR) than men, but not schizophrenic women (lower OAR). Men with schizophrenia however, have a higher orbitofrontal-to-amygdala ratio than that of healthy men.
 Before menopause, women are less likely to suffer from cardiovascular disease. However, after age 60, the risk for both men and women is the same.
 Overall, men are more likely to suffer from cancer, with much of this driven by lung cancer. In most countries, more men than women smoke, although this gap is narrowing especially among young women.
 Women are twice as likely to be blind as men. In developed countries, this may be linked to higher life expectancy and age-related conditions. In developing countries, women are less likely to get timely treatments for conditions that lead to blindness such as cataracts and trachoma.
 Women are more likely to suffer from osteoarthritis and osteoporosis. The density of bones depends upon the stresses that are put on them through exercise. Exercise and activity in childhood help to build up higher density bones. Although in Britain women's bones are less dense even before menopause, in some African societies, men and women are equally susceptible to osteoporosis.

Infectious disease prevalence varies - this is largely due to cultural and exposure factors. In particular the WHO notes that:
 Worldwide, more men than women are infected with HIV. The exception is sub-Saharan Africa, where more women than men are infected.
 Adult males are more likely to be diagnosed with tuberculosis.

Some other sex-related health differences include:
 Anterior cruciate ligament injuries, especially in basketball, occur more often in women than in men.
 From conception to death, but particularly before adulthood, females are generally less vulnerable than males to developmental difficulties and chronic illnesses. This could be due to females having two x chromosomes instead of just one, or in the reduced exposure to testosterone.

See also 
 Sex ratio
 Sex differences in psychology
 Gender-based medicine
 Genetics of sex
 Gender differences in coping
 Sexual dimorphism
 Sex differentiation
 Sex and intelligence
 Virilization
 List of homologues of the human reproductive system
 Man flu

Notes

Sources

Further reading 
  Full text

External links 
 

Physiology
Social inequality